Jakub Vojta (born 19 April 1991) is a Czech football midfielder currently playing for FK Baník Most.

External links 
 
 
 Guardian Stats Centre

1991 births
Living people
Czech footballers
Czech First League players
FC Slovan Liberec players
FK Bohemians Prague (Střížkov) players
FK Baník Most players
Association football midfielders